Lisa Guyer (born October 25, 1963) is an American singer, guitarist, and songwriter. She was born into a musical family that put on shows in their community, and Guyer learned to sing and dance by age four. Guyer's vocal skills are completely self-taught. Godsmack's Sully Erna describes Guyer as having "a phenomenal voice and a four-octave range". Guyer is an associate professor at Berklee College of Music in Boston.

Discography 
 With The Lisa Guyer Band
Gypsy Girl (1997)
Leap of Faith (2000)

 With Sully Erna
Avalon (2010)
Avalon Live (2010)
Hometown Life (2016)

Filmography 
Sully Erna Presents: The Journey to Avalon (2011)
Sully Erna: Avalon Live (2012)

References 

American women singers
1963 births
American rock singers
Living people
21st-century American women